Alışar (also, Alyshar, Alishar, and Alisher) is a village and municipality in the Sharur District of Nakhchivan Autonomous Republic, Azerbaijan. It is located 5 km in the south-west from the district center, on the bank of the Araz River, on the Sharur plain. Its population is busy with grain-growing and animal husbandry. There are secondary school, club, library and a medical center in the village. It has a population of 2,132. National Hero of Azerbaijan Maharram Seyidov was born in this village.

Etymology
Alışarlar (Alyshars)-  is the branch of the Sofulu tribe of Turkic Kengerli (Kangars) who participated in ethnogeny of Azerbaijanis. Basically, they are live in the Alışar (Alyshar) village of the Sharur District. The name of the village is related with Alışarlar (Alyshars); this settlement was established by the same tribe.

Notable natives 

 Maharram Seyidov — National Hero of Azerbaijan
 Seyyad Ezizoglu - Poet

References 

Populated places in Sharur District